Feock is a village in the province of Mashonaland West, Zimbabwe. It is located about 8 km north of Mutorashanga. According to the 1982 Population Census, the village had a population of 2,866. The village started as a residential and commercial township for the Feock chromite mine.

Populated places in Mashonaland West Province